The Laos women's national rugby union team is a national sporting side that represents Thailand in women's rugby union. They first played international sevens rugby in 2007 at the South East Asia sevens, where they finished third. They then played a ten-a-side international against Cambodia in 2009, and in 2010 they won a non-test match developmental tournament involving Thailand and the Philippines. Their first full test was against Thailand in 2011.

Results summary
(Full internationals only)

Results

Full internationals

External links
 Laos on IRB.com
 Laos on rugbydata.com
 Lao Rugby Federation
 Laos women's team (2010)
 Lao government comments on hosting of 2011 Asian Championship
 Lao Federation flyer promoting the 2011 Asian Championship
 Asian RFU coverage of 2011 Asian Championship, hosted by Laos
 Report on 2011 Asian Championship, hosted by Laos
 Laos rugby federation Facebook page, including video from 2011 Asian championship

Rugby union in Laos
Asian national women's rugby union teams
Rugby union
Women's national rugby union teams